Sai ua or northern Thai sausage or Chiang Mai sausage is a grilled pork sausage from northern Thailand and northeastern Burma. In Thailand, it is a standard food of the northern provinces and it has become very popular in the rest of Thailand as well. Its name in Thai comes from sai (intestine) and from ua (to stuff). In Shan State, this sausage is known as sai long phik.

Sai ua contains minced pork meat, herbs, spices, and kaeng khua red curry paste. It is usually eaten grilled with sticky rice and other dishes or served as a snack or starter. Traditionally sai ua was a homemade sausage, but today it is readily available in shops.

See also 
 Naem – a fermented pork sausage in Thai cuisine
 Sai krok Isan – a fermented sausage from northeastern Thailand
 List of sausages
 List of Thai dishes

References

External links

Northern Thai in Western Melbourne

Thai sausages
Northern Thai cuisine
Burmese cuisine